Araunah (Hebrew:  ’Ǎrawnā) was a Jebusite mentioned in the Second Book of Samuel, who owned the threshing floor on Mount Moriah which David purchased and used as the site for assembling an altar to God. The First Book of Chronicles, a later text, renders his name as Ornan (Hebrew:  ’Ārənān).

Biblical narrative
The Samuel version is the final member of a group of narratives which together constitute the "appendix" (2 Samuel 21–24) of the Books of Samuel, and which do not fit into the chronological ordering of the rest of Samuel. In the Samuel narrative, God was angry again both with Israel and with king David who imposed a census upon Israel, an order which Joab reluctantly carried out. In the version of the narrative presented by the Book of Chronicles, it was Satan who incited David to make the census. Yahweh regarded David's action as a sin, and so punished him, sending Gad the prophet to offer David a choice between three punishments:
3 months of fleeing from an invader,
3 days of plague from the Angel of the Lord.

David indicated that instead of falling into the hands of men, he would rather fall into the hands of the Lord's mercy and discretion. So an angel was sent to spread the plague through the land. However, when the angel reached Jerusalem, God ordered the angel to stop; at this point the angel was at Araunah's threshing floor, which David noticed. God instructed David to build an altar at Araunah's threshing floor, so David purchased the location from Araunah for a fair price, even though Araunah offered it to him freely. According to the Books of Samuel, David paid 50 silver shekels for the threshing floor and the oxen (2 Samuel 24:24); Chronicles states that David paid 600 gold shekels for the entire site where the threshing floor was located (1 Chronicles 21:25). Biblical scholar H. P. Mathys notes that the purchase of threshing floor "is modelled on Abraham's purchase of Machpelah's cave (Genesis 23), even repeating specific details, the most important of which is David's insistence on paying the full price (an expression used only in Genesis 23:9 and in 1 Chronicles 21:22,24). The 600 gold (sic) shekels David pays is more than Abraham's 400 silver shekels [paid] for Machpelah's cave."

Census
In the Books of Samuel, the census is said to indicate that there were 1,300,000 men fit for military service. The Book of Chronicles states that the figure was 1,570,000 men fit for military service.

Joab's reluctance to complete the census is thought by some scholars to have been due to a religious belief that the people belonged to God, and hence that only God should know how many there were. Some scholars believe the motive for the census was pride, that David's numbering of the people was to show his strength as a king; his sin in this was relying on human numbers instead of God. Other scholars believe that a more mundane motive is the reason – that the knowledge gained from a census would enable David to impose more accurate taxes and levies, and thus the census would be unpopular with the people who were at risk of higher taxes or levies.

Identity of Araunah
The Bible identified Araunah as a Jebusite. Some biblical scholars believe that he may have simply been the Jebusite king of Jerusalem at the time. The word araunah is not a personal name but a title meaning "the lord" in Hurrian and other near eastern languages. In , Araunah is referred to as a king: "... Araunah the king gave to the king [i.e., David]".

Notes

 

Angelic visionaries
Books of Samuel people
Jebusites